This is a list of the National Prizes awarded by Spain's Ministry of Culture.

National Prize for Spanish Literature
National Literature Prizes: 
Essays
Drama
Infants' and children's literature
Narrative (Novel)
Poetry
Poetry for Young People “Miguel Hernández”
National Prize for History of Spain
National Prize for the Best Translation
National Prize for the Work of a Translator
National Comic Prize
National Illustration Prize
National Prize for Cultural Journalism
National Prize for the Promotion of Reading
National Prize for the Best Cultural Editorial Work

See also
List of Premios Nacionales de Literatura (Spain)

Spanish literary awards
Lists of literary awards